New Boston Independent School District is a public school district based in New Boston, Texas (USA).   In addition to New Boston, the district also serves the community of Boston.

In 2009, the school district was rated "academically acceptable" by the Texas Education Agency.

Schools
New Boston High School (9th-12th)
New Boston Middle School (6th-8th)
Crestview Elementary School (3rd-5th)
Oakview Primary School (PK-2nd)

References

External links
New Boston ISD

School districts in Bowie County, Texas